The  Wildlife and Natural Environment (Scotland) Act 2011 or WANE Act is an Act of the Scottish Parliament which introduced legislation to that country, affecting the way land and the environment is managed. The Act also amended earlier environmental legislation, including the Wildlife and Countryside Act 1981 and the Deer (Scotland) Act 1996.

Principal elements
The Act affected game-shooting, species protection, and introduced new wildlife offences into Scotland such as vicarious liability.
Amongst other things it:
abolished the designation of areas of special protection for wild birds; 
increased regulation of snaring practices;
introduced a closed season for the killing of mountain hares;
introduced a new regime for controlling invasive non-native species;
changed arrangements for deer management and deer stalking;
strengthened badger protection;
required Scottish Ministers to present an annual report to Parliament of offences relating to wildlife crime;
changed the legislation relating to the burning of moorland (muirburn), previously prescribed in the Hill Farming Act 1946;
made operational changes to how Sites of Special Scientific Interest are managed;
required three-yearly reports to be published by public bodies on compliance with the Biodiversity Duty.

See also
Environment (Wales) Act 2016
Natural Environment and Rural Communities Act 2006

References

Nature conservation in Scotland
Environmental law in the United Kingdom
Acts of the Scottish Parliament 2011
2011 in the environment